There have been 4 Formula One drivers from Uruguay.

Former drivers
Eitel Cantoni was the first. He entered three races in 1952: Britain, where he failed to finish; Germany, where he again failed to finish; and Italy, where he finished 11th.

Alberto Uria entered the Argentine Grands Prix of 1955 and 1956. He retired from the former and finished 6th in the latter.

Óscar González only race was a shared drive with Uria in the 1956 Argentine Grand Prix. He completed the second half of the race, finishing in the 6th place, 10 laps down from the race winner and 3 laps behind the 5th-placed driver.

Asdrúbal Fontes Bayardo is the most recent Uruguayan to enter a Grand Prix. He failed to start the 1959 French Grand Prix, his only attempt at a Grand Prix.

Timeline

References